High Justice is a 1974 collection of science fiction short stories by American writer Jerry Pournelle. It was republished in an omnibus edition with Exiles to Glory in 2009 as Exile—and Glory.

A major part of the background of these stories is the final fall of the Welfare States; Russia is never mentioned, and the US is downsliding due to inflation and political corruption. In short, Earth's civilization is about to collapse under the weight of its bureaucracies, but a new civilization is being built by determined multinational corporations. The stories were published between 1972 and 1975, and reflect Pournelle's concerns with the effects of environmentalism, welfare states, and high taxes on the ability of people to make advances in technology. At that time the Great Society, America's version of the Welfare State, was not even 10 years old.

Each short story concerns itself with the problems facing large technological tasks in the near future. These include plutonium fuel breeding, deep sea thermal power, large scale food cultivation and access to fresh water. The protagonists are the agents of multinational corporations—engineers engaged in large scale projects and troubleshooters engaged in protecting said engineers. Though economic competitors are mentioned in passing, the primary antagonists are political—untrustworthy governments and covert operatives acting on their behalf.

Pournelle's view of corporate mega-projects is similar to that of Robert A. Heinlein as expressed in stories such as The Man Who Sold the Moon, or more recently in the work of Tom Clancy. Top executives concentrate on financial risk, while engineers on the ground handle logistics and are extremely competent. Incompetent engineers get fired. There are no meddling vice presidents, craven middle managers or deadhead employees of the sort generally found in any large technical effort—mostly because Pournelle's corporations lack trade unions to prevent their expulsion. 

The projects described in these stories reflect technologies described in Pournelle's non-fiction collection, "A Step Farther Out":

 A laser launch system for sending cargo into orbit, with MHD power generators based on rocket engines.
 The NERVA nuclear rocket engine project.
 Spacecraft using ion drives traversing the Solar System.
 Asteroid mining.
 Ocean thermal power generation with fish farming as a by-product of the artificial upwelling of cold nutrient-rich water from the deep ocean.

The short novel Exiles to Glory is a sequel, featuring two characters from these stories. Another short novel, Birth of Fire, is considered by the author to also be part of this universe, and has similar themes, though it draws more from the author's military SF. Pournelle also had plans to add a story he called "Lisabetta" to this series.

The stories are considered by some as part of the CoDominium series, a future history stretching to the early 31st century. Certainly the themes of decay in the rich democracies are the same. The technology excludes innovations like the Langston field and the Alderson drive which are the main driving forces in the human diaspora projected for the 21st century. The publisher makes the claim that these are the stories that "started it all", but Pournelle himself considers it a separate "no FTL" universe.

Stories
 "A Matter of Sovereignty": Nuclear General Company has to go to Tonga to set up its breeder reactors. Some large scale fish farming is a by-product, as is a sanctuary for some of the last blue whales on Earth. But there is always somebody looking to grab a piece of the action; Fiji has impounded a shipload of plutonium, not to mention a lot of Tongan fishing boats, and those darn Chileans want an arm and a leg to let icebergs be towed through their waters. The US Navy won't bully a small power to protect Big Business, and the Japanese are about to foreclose on the whole shebang-and make sushi out of the whales as an after-dinner snack. Solution? Take "flag of convenience" to the next level.
 "Power to the People": Nuclear General Company can park an iceberg on the coast of Namibia, process seawater with nuclear reactors and make the desert bloom. But that U.S.-born black revolutionary over the border has built his power on poverty and populism. He demands food and power for the people. Not his real motive, of course. But you can always take him at his word, even if the people don't get the kind of power he was thinking of.
 "Enforcer": More bergs and reactors, this time mining the ocean floor off the Malvinas/Falklands. The new junta in Argentina wants in on the project, never mind what the last Presidente agreed to. Call in INTERSEC, the trans-national enforcer of contracts. When the one holdout on the junta refuses to see reason, it Is time for Plan B. (This story was written before the Falklands War took place.)
 "High Justice": Solicitor General Aeneas Mackenzie cleaned up the White House and it cost him his job. Now he is working for the kind of people he crusaded against, who happen to work for his once and future lover. Laurie Jo Hansen has the Hansen Corporation and a lot of power. Power and money can still get humanity into space, even if the government can't, or won't.  But when the Agency starts committing murder to sabotage the effort, it is time for justice to go into orbit, in the person of Judge Aeneas Mackenzie.
 "Extreme Prejudice": Terminating a rogue agent ought to be simple.  Especially when he is too busy ensuring the future of humanity to protect himself. But maybe that is the best armor of all.
 "Consort": Aeneas Mackenzie has the ship Valkyrie ready to leave Earth orbit and go to the Moon.  The Lunatic advance party is already on the ground preparing the site for the colony. But getting the NERVA rocket engine into orbit, along with Laurie Jo, requires one last deal with the devil. A corrupt President masquerading as an honest populist is the only one who can help them. He is also the one who fired Aeneas for purging half the White House. Thanks to Laurie Jo he is being hounded in the media. Laurie Jo can promise to call off her dogs if he delivers, and leave Earth forever to boot.  But the President is more afraid of Aeneas Mackenzie, once his oldest friend, than he is of her.
 "Tinker": An ion drive space tug is the only ship able to rendezvous with a disabled ship carrying valuable cargo and 1700 passengers. That it happens to be in the right place at the right time, with the right fuel on hand, turns out to be the pivot on which the whole story turns. A Hansen Corporation agent is on the job, however. (Incidentally, this story ends the collection on what could be considered a sour note. The rest of the stories were set on Earth, where the governments got their way and the multinationals had to scramble to succeed. This final story is set solely in space, where the multiplanetaries rule—and they are never going to let a government rise to challenge them. The corporate troubleshooter unilaterally punishes the political antagonists, and complaints are made that only those employed by the multiplanetary corporations will prosper from that point on. In short, democracy has failed—human civilization is now feudal, run by the corporations.)

References

External links
 
 

1974 short story collections
Fiction about asteroid mining
CoDominium series
Novels by Jerry Pournelle
Science fiction short story collections